St Joseph Engineering College (SJEC) is an engineering college in Vamanjoor, Mangalore, India. Being a unit of the Roman Catholic Diocese of Mangalore, it is the only Catholic engineering institute in Mangalore. Established in 2002, it is one of the highly reputed institutions in the region, despite being relatively new.
An autonomous institute under Visvesvaraya Technological University, Belagavi, Karnataka State, SJEC is recognized by the All India Council for Technical Education (AICTE), New Delhi. It offers five NBA Accredited B.E. Programs viz. Mechanical Engineering, Computer Science and Engineering, Electronics and Communication Engineering, Electrical and Electronics Engineering and Civil Engineering.

It offers undergraduate and postgraduate courses in Engineering, Masters in Business Administration and Masters in Computer Applications.

History
The college was established in the year 2002 as St Joseph Engineering College by Diocese of Mangalore under the guidance of bishop Aloysius Paul D'Souza by Fr Valerian D'Souza .

Campus

St Joseph Engineering College campus is located at Vamanjoor  to the east of Mangalore City centre, which is well connected by train, road and air. City and service buses run every five minutes from the city centre to the college campus along the National Highway towards Moodbidri via Kulshekar. There are three academic blocks in the college, which house all the departments.

Hostels
There are separate male and female hostels on the campus.

Governing board and management
 President - Most Rev. Dr Peter Paul Saldanha - Bishop of Mangalore.
 Vice President - Rt. Rev. Msgr Maxim Noronha - Vicar General of Diocese of Mangalore.
 Director - Rev. Fr Wilfred Prakash D’Souza
 Assistant Director - Rev. Fr Alwyn Richard D'Souza.
 Principal - Dr Rio D'Souza

Academic profile
The following BE courses are Accredited by the National Board of Accreditation, Delhi: Computer Science Engineering, Electronics and Communication Engineering and Electrical and Electronics Engineering for the Year 2016-2019.

Departments and courses
Undergraduate
These departments offer four-year undergraduate courses in engineering

 Mechanical Engineering
 Electronics and Communication Engineering
 Electrical and Electronics Engineering
 Computer Science and Engineering
 Computer Science and Business Studies.
 Artificial Intelligence and Machine Learning.
 Civil Engineering

Postgraduate
 Masters in Business Administration (MBA)
 Masters in Computer Applications (MCA)
 Masters in Technology in Mechanical Engineering (MTech-CAMS)
 Masters in Technology in Electrical Engineering (MTech-PE)
 Masters in Computer Science and Engineering (MTech-CSE)
 M.Sc. (Engg.) by Research in Mechanical Engineering
 M.Sc. (Engg.) by Research in Computer Science & Engineering
 M.Sc (Engg. ) by Research in Electrical and Electronics Engineering
 Ph.D. in Physics, Chemistry, Mechanical Engineering, Computer Science and Engineering, Electrical and Electronics Engineering and Business Administration.

Distribution of seats
The distribution of seats are as follows:-
 Mechanical Engineering, 120 seats 
 Electronics and Communication Engineering, 120 seats
 Electrical and Electronics Engineering, 60 seats
 Computer Science and Engineering, 120 seats
 Civil Engineering, 60 seats
 Masters in Business Administration, 60 seats
 Masters in Computer Applications, 60 seats
 Masters in Technology in Computer Science and Engineering, 18 seats
 Masters in Technology in Electronics and Communication Engineering, 18 seats
 Masters in Technology in Electrical Engineering, 18 seats

Student activities

Technical fest
 The Annual National Level Technical fest of SJEC is called TIARA held in the Month of February
 College Day Celebrations - February
 Annual Sports Day - February
 Foundation Day Lecture - February
 Yuvalakshya - National Level UG Fest - February
 ZEPHYR - National Level Management Fest - April
 TechPrints - National Level Technical Paper Presentation - MCA - April
 eTIME - National Conference on Emerging Trends in Mechanical Engineering - August
 NCACSP - National Conference on Advances in Communication and Signal Processing - August
 Joshiana - National Level IT Fest - (September - October)
 Milan- Cultural festival celebration - September 
 Rendition - September 
 Graduation Day - November

Sports
The following sports facilities are available:
 Athletics – 200 m track
 Basketball court
 Four outdoor shuttle badminton courts
 Football ground / hockey ground / handball court
 Cricket field
 Volleyball court / throw ball court
 Multi-gym facility for men and women
 Indoor: carrom, chess, table tennis

References

All India Council for Technical Education
Engineering colleges in Mangalore
Educational institutions established in 2002
2002 establishments in Karnataka